The Left Ginza is one of the two parts of the Ginza Rabba, the longest and the most important holy scripture of Mandaeism. The other part of the Ginza Rabba is the Right Ginza.

Summaries of each book (or tractate), based mostly on Häberl (2007), are provided below. Translated excerpts are from Gelbert (2011), while Mandaic transliterations are derived from Gelbert (2011, 2021).

Book 1
Book 1 is a four-part prose text on the salvation process, beginning with the ascension to heaven of Seth, in advance of his father Adam (compare Sethian Gnosticism).
Chapter 1.1 is about Adam and his three sons. One of Adam's sons, Sheetil (Seth), volunteers to die before his father. 49 paragraphs in Gelbert (2011). The chapter begins with the opening lines:
Who are the mountains that do not shake,
and the heavens of waters that do not change?
Chapter 1.2 continues the story of Adam after his soul is cast into a material body. 80 paragraphs in Gelbert (2011). 80 paragraphs in Gelbert (2011).
Chapter 1.3 is about Hawa (Eve) mourning the death of her husband and her encounters with the uthras. It also describes the death of Hawa. 58 paragraphs in Gelbert (2011).
Chapter 1.4 is a detailed description of the masiqta and the maṭarta (stations) that lie between Earth and the World of Light. 43 paragraphs in Gelbert (2011).

Book 2
Book 2, poetic, comprises 28 hymns.

All of the hymns in Book 2 of the Left Ginza, in which the mana laments that it has been cast into the physical world, begin with the following refrain:

Since Mandaean priestly commentary texts often refer to hymns and prayers by their opening lines, the opening lines of each of the 28 hymns in the book are provided below. The English translations below are from Gelbert (2011), while the Mandaic transliterations are derived from Gelbert (2011, 2021). Many of the opening lines are repeated but with the individual words ordered differently; in such cases, both versions are provided and are separated by semicolons.

Who has let me dwell in the Tibil? / 
Who has thrown me into the (place) of secrets and winks? / 
Who has thrown me into the misery of the worlds? / 
Who took me out of my treasure-house? / 
A son of great radiance, a son of the lustrous glory / 
I am confirmed through the goodness of my Father / 
Who threw me into the misfortune of the angels? / 
I went away in order to come into the world. / 
Why did my appearance change? / 
From Thee, my Father, I am learning / 
Who has let me dwell in the bodily vestment? / 
They went and brought me into the Tibil. / 
Who brought me here? / 
Into this world they sent him / 
Arise, go the house of the Seven! / 
In the reliable treasure he sits / 
There is no treachery or cunning in him / 
Who brought me out of the house of the Life? / 
There is (something) in me from the treasure of the Life. / 
I lived among the hidden fosterers. / 
When did they take me into captivity / 
I was in the hidden treasure-house / 
Who has planted me, sent me away / 
They brought me out of the house of the Great (Life) / ; I have come in order to raise the stem on high / 
Who brought me away from my place? / 
Here I stayed with the generations. / 
Who brought me away from my place? / 
Who brought me away from my place? /

Book 3
Book 3, poetic, comprises 62 hymns, several of which are identical to or based on prayers in the Qolasta. Poems in Book 3 poetically describe the masiqta (ascension) of the soul to World of Light. They typically describe the soul (nišimta) being taken out of the ʿuṣṭuna, or "bodily trunk," and being guided by uthras through the matartas and past Ruha and the Seven Planets, as well as being taken up by the right hand into the World of Light and clothed in radiant garments of light.

Since Mandaean priestly commentary texts often refer to hymns and prayers by their the opening lines, the opening lines of each of the 62 hymns in the book are provided below. The English translations below are from Gelbert (2011), while the Mandaic transliterations are derived from Gelbert (2011, 2021).

After the firmament was spread out
Provided and provisioned I am (see Qolasta prayer 96 and Psalms of Thomas 13, 18)
Hail to thee, hail to thee, soul (see Qolasta prayer 94)
Go in peace, chosen one, pure one (see Qolasta prayer 92)
Repose and peace will prevail (see Qolasta prayer 69)
Repose and peace prevail
On the day on which the soul goes out, on the day on which the perfect one ascends on high (see Qolasta prayer 98)
On the day on which the soul goes forth, on the day on which the perfect one ascends on high
Between the concealment and the radiance, and between the revelation and the hidden place
Among the chosen ones I am the head of the well-versed (see Qolasta prayer 93)
Let the Great (Life) be mentioned in goodness, let the Mighty (Life) be mentioned in goodness
How greatly I rejoice
Faith in the Good came to me, they say: "thou shalt go forth".
When the darkness was thinking, Adam departed his body
My measure has come to an end and I am heading out, the spirit speaks to the soul (see Psalms of Thomas 2)
The soul in the fruit of the Life
The voice of the soul of the Life I hear
Although a child, my lifespan ended
I am standing upon my high place, and my eyes look upon the earthly world (see Psalms of Thomas 18)
Between the concealment and the radiance, between the light and the uthras (see Qolasta prayer 68)
The soul is going out; her measure is full, and her time has come.
I am redeemed, my measure is full (see Psalms of Thomas 13)
A voice called out from the heights
I passed by the gate of the prisoners
I have a soul in the Tibil; she is dying and sleeping in the world; she is dying and sleeping in the world
Whose soul is this, who is edified and cultivated?
It is a sealed letter which goes out of the world (see Qolasta prayer 73)
I am going out from my body
I was saved, my measure was full
When will my measure be full
What do the good ones look like, when they go out of their body?
Whose soul is this, who is edified and cultivated?
My measure is full and I am heading out.
As a child my lifespan ended
The sound, the sound of a sound
Good is the Truth for the good one
I hear the voice of the soul
[I am] a mana from the house of the Great (Life) (see Psalms of Thomas 13)
The soul, the soul of the Life speaks, Who held me down in the earthly world?
I came to my end and am sleeping (see Qolasta prayer 66 and Psalms of Thomas 6)
My measure has come to an end and I am heading out
As a child, my lifespan ended
The mana weeps through the generations
The mana speaks to the generations, I am a circlet of beryl
I am a good one, a son of the Great (Life) I am
A great radiance am I
Out of a righteous place
My soul longed for the Life
How long hast thou been standing here?
I passed by the door of the prisoners
O ye birds of the carob trees (see also Tree of Jiva and Atman in Hinduism)
At the construction, at the beginning of the whole construction
My measure has come to an end and I am heading out, an expert who has learnt from the watchful ones
I hear the voice of a soul, who is tearing herself away from the dwelling of the evil ones
I hear the voice of a soul, who is going out from the body of grossness
One of children of kušṭa
A being of radiance, I am a son of a being of radiance, I am a being of radiance, a son of the Mighty (Life)
Whom and whom, soul didst thou
At the door of the house of the Abaddons, a throne for the spirit is set up

Hymns 17 and 58 contain the following refrain:
Naked they brought me into the world,
and naked they take me out of it.
Naked they take me out of it,
like a bird that is unaccompanied by anything.

Hymns 18, 37, and 45 all contain variations of the opening line, "As a child, my lifespan ended".

Hymn 62 contains the refrain, "Come, fall into the vessel (mana)".

Colophon
Book 3 of the Left Ginza is followed by a colophon. There is only one colophon in the Left Ginza, whereas the Right Ginza has six colophons.

Qolasta parallels

Several of the prayers in Drower's 1959 Canonical Prayerbook of the Mandaeans (CP), mostly ʿniania ("responses") and masiqta prayers, correspond to hymns in Book 3 of the Left Ginza (GL 3):

See also

Ginza Rabba
Right Ginza
Book of Genesis
Psalms
Bardo Thodol in Tibetan Buddhism
Book of the Dead in Ancient Egyptian religion
Funerary text
Near-death experience, descriptions of which often resemble the contents of the Left Ginza

References

Mandaean texts
Books about death
Religion and death
Funerary texts